Inquisitor ritae is a species of sea snail, a marine gastropod mollusk in the family Pseudomelatomidae, the turrids and allies.

Description

Distribution
This marine species occurs off the Philippines.

References

 Stahlschmidt P. & Fraussen K. (2017). Description of Inquisitor ritae new species from the Philippines (Conoidea: Pseudomelatomidae). Miscellanea Malacologica. 7(2): 29-32

ritae
Gastropods described in 2017